Salamerta is a village in the town of Mandiraja, Banjarnegara Regency, Central Java Province, Indonesia. This villages has an area of 472,74 hectares and a population of 3.869 inhabitants in 2010.

References

External links
 Banjarnegara regency official website
 BPS Kabupaten Banjarnegara

Banjarnegara Regency
Villages in Central Java